Patrick Carey may refer to:

Patrick Cary (1624–1658), English poet
Patrick Carey (cinematographer) (1916–1996)